Emanuel "Manny" Steward (July 7, 1944 – October 25, 2012) was an American boxer, trainer, and commentator for HBO Boxing. He was also called the Godfather of Detroit Boxing. Steward trained 41 world champion fighters throughout his career, most notably Thomas Hearns, through the famous Kronk Gym and later heavyweights Lennox Lewis and Wladimir Klitschko. Emanuel trained over two dozen boxers who turned out to be champions in the course of his career. His heavyweight fighters had a combined record of 34-2-1 in title fights. He was an inducted of the International Boxing Hall Of Fame, and the World Boxing Hall of Fame. Steward was also known for his charity work in Detroit, Michigan, helping youth to attain an education.

Life and career
Steward was born in Bottom Creek, West Virginia, but, by the age of 12, he had moved with his mother to Detroit, Michigan, after she divorced his father, who was a coal miner.  After moving to Detroit, he worked briefly in the auto industry before eventually going to Brewster Recreation Center, where Joe Louis and Eddie Futch trained. Steward began an amateur boxing career there. He compiled a record of 94 wins and 3 losses as an amateur boxer, including winning the 1963 national Golden Gloves tournament in the bantamweight division.

In 1971, Steward took his half brother, James Steward, to the nearby Kronk Gym, a hot-bed for amateur boxers in the 1970s, and became a part-time coach there.  Steward trained many of the nation's top amateurs. He eventually translated his success with amateurs into a career training championship-level professional fighters.

On March 2, 1980, Hilmer Kenty became Steward's first world champion by knocking out world lightweight champ Ernesto España. Steward achieved his most notable early success with welterweight Thomas Hearns, whom he changed from a light hitting boxer into one of the most devastating punchers in boxing history.  Hearns became one of Steward's most successful and popular fighters, fighting Sugar Ray Leonard, knocking out Roberto Durán, and challenging undisputed middleweight champion Marvelous Marvin Hagler. 
He was well known for his outgoing personality and endless energy. In addition, he was very giving and was known for being a father figure. He even, at one point, obtained a 97-3 title. Even though he fought, his main passion was training.

Death
Steward died on October 25, 2012, after undergoing surgery for diverticulitis. He was 68. Colon cancer was subsequently reported as a contributing factor to his death.

Ken Hershman, president of HBO Sports, where Steward had worked as a commentator since 2001, released a statement, saying: "There are no adequate words to describe the enormous degree of sadness and loss we feel at HBO Sports with the tragic passing of Manny Steward. For more than a decade, Manny was a respected colleague who taught us so much not only about the sweet science but also about friendship and loyalty. His energy, enthusiasm and bright smile were a constant presence. Ten bells do not seem enough to mourn his passing. His contributions to the sport and to HBO will never be forgotten. Our thoughts and prayers are with his family."

Honors
Elected into the International Boxing Hall of Fame
Elected into the World Boxing Hall of Fame

Kronk Gym

Kronk Gym became a property of Steward's, who was also famous for his collection of Rolls-Royce cars and mansions. He opened a branch of the gym in Tucson, Arizona, and started an association with the Dodge Theater in Phoenix to present boxing undercards once a month.

Fighters trained
Among the world champions and top rated contenders who trained or sought Steward's guidance at some point of their careers were:

 Dennis Andries
 Johnathon Banks
 Wilfred Benítez
 Jesse Benavides
 Mark Breland
 Cornelius Bundrage
 Oba Carr
 Julio César Chávez
 Kermit Cintron
 Miguel Cotto
 Chad Dawson
 Oscar De La Hoya
 Domonique Dolton
 Tyson Fury
 Yuriorkis Gamboa
 Miguel Ángel González
 Mickey Goodwin
 Naseem Hamed
 Thomas Hearns
 Evander Holyfield
 John David Jackson
 Hilmer Kenty
 Ole Klemetsen
 Wladimir Klitschko
 Andy Lee
 William "Caveman" Lee
 Lennox Lewis
 Oliver McCall
 Mike McCallum
 Gerald McClellan
 Milton McCrory
 Steve McCrory
 Michael Moorer
 Andrew Murray
 Jimmy Paul
 Aaron Pryor
 Graciano Rocchigiani
 Tarick Salmaci
 Adonis Stevenson
 Jermain Taylor
 Duane Thomas
 James Toney
 Syd Vanderpool
 Ricky Womack

References

External links
 Kronk Gym
 BoxingInsider.com Bio * profile inter/view with Emanuel Steward

American boxing trainers
American male boxers
Sportspeople from Detroit
People from McDowell County, West Virginia
1944 births
2012 deaths
Bantamweight boxers
Boxers from Detroit
Deaths from cancer in Illinois
Deaths from colorectal cancer
Deaths from diverticulitis